Otologics LLC is a medical device company that produces middle ear hearing implants. Its headquarters are located in Boulder, Colorado, with offices and a distribution network throughout Europe, Asia, and Latin America.

The development of Otologics' middle ear implants began with the work of John M. Fredrickson, M.D., in the 1970s and 80s while he was a surgeon and researcher at the Washington University School of Medicine in St. Louis, Missouri. In 1996, Otologics LLC was founded in Boulder, Colorado by Jose Bedoya.

Otologics LLC filed for Chapter 11 bankruptcy in July 2012 and is currently negotiating with a possible buyer and seeking DIP financing.

Products 
Otologics produces Carina and MET, middle ear implants which bypass the ear canal and eardrum. Middle ear implantable hearing devices are relatively recent developments in the treatment of hearing loss, and, unlike conventional hearing aids, they are either partially or fully implanted within the body. Otologics is one of three companies which produce middle ear hearing implants. The other two companies are Envoy Medical and Med-El Corporation.
The Carina device is Otologics’ flagship product and it includes a rechargeable battery and a microphone that is implanted entirely under the skin.
Carina and MET received their CE mark in October 2006 and are sold throughout Europe, Asia and Latin America.
In the United States, Otologics hearing implants are currently undergoing approval process by the Food and Drug Administration.

References 

Medical technology companies of the United States
Manufacturing companies based in Boulder, Colorado
Companies established in 1996